The Eveleth Rangers were an amateur ice hockey team from Eveleth, Minnesota that played in various amateur leagues during the first half of the 1900s. As a member of the United States Amateur Hockey Association (1920–1925) the team was known as the Eveleth Reds, and in 1925–26 they played as the Eveleth-Hibbing Rangers in the CAHL, out of the Hibbing Memorial Arena in Hibbing, Minnesota.

History
During the inaugural USAHA season in 1920–21 Eveleth finished as runner-ups after having lost the final four-game series to the Cleveland Indians by a 12-14 aggregate score. The biggest star player on the team in the early 1920s was defenseman Ivan "Ching" Johnson, who had joined the club from the Winnipeg Monarchs.

Notable players
Ching Johnson – Hockey Hall of Fame inductee
Vic Desjardins – United States Hockey Hall of Fame inductee
Percy Galbraith
Jimmy Herbert
Eddie Rodden
Laurie Scott

References

Notes

Defunct ice hockey teams in Minnesota
Ice hockey teams in Minnesota
United States Amateur Hockey Association teams